Herman Joseph Arvie (born October 12, 1970) is a retired American professional football player who played four seasons in the National Football League as an offensive tackle with the Cleveland Browns and Baltimore Ravens. Arvie was drafted by the Browns out of Grambling State University in the fifth round of the 1993 NFL Draft. Arvie played three seasons with the Browns before the franchise moved to Baltimore and became the Baltimore Ravens. With the Ravens in 1996, Arvie scored his only touchdown, scoring on a one-yard reception. After the 1996 season, Arvie retired from football.

References

1970 births
American football offensive tackles
Baltimore Ravens players
Cleveland Browns players
Living people
Players of American football from Louisiana
People from Opelousas, Louisiana
Grambling State Tigers football players